The 2021 season was the 112th season in the history of Sport Club Corinthians Paulista. The season covered the period from 26 February 2021 to December 2021. The effects of the COVID-19 pandemic and its major impact in the 2020 season were still felt on this season, as there was no pre-season and the first game took place just three days after the last season's match. The majority of games were still played behind closed doors.

Background

Kit
 Home (June 2021 onward): White shirt, black shorts and white socks;
 Away (May 2021 onward): Black with white stripes shirt, white shorts and black socks;
 Third (September 2021 onward): Purple shirt, purple shorts and purple socks.

Previous Kits
 Home (Until June 2021): White shirt, black shorts and white socks;
 Away (Until May 2021): Black with white stripes shirt, white shorts and black socks;
 Third (Until September 2021): Brown and blue shirt, brown shorts and brown socks.

COVID-19 pandemic
On October 5, Corinthians played their first match with fans in the stadium since February 25, 2020, as Neo Química Arena featured a 30% stadium capacity. Matches are expected to feature a 50% stadium capacity as of October 15 and full capacity in November.

Squad

Managerial changes
On May 16, Vágner Mancini was fired after losing the 2021 Campeonato Paulista semi-finals to Palmeiras at Neo Química Arena. The club decided that three club professionals would take over training duties while a new manager was expected to be chosen: head of performance analysis Fernando Lázaro, fitness coach Flávio de Oliveira and head scout Mauro da Silva. Lázaro served as caretaker for the last two matches at the 2021 Copa Sudamericana against Sport Huancayo and River Plate.

On May 23, former club player Sylvinho was announced as the club's new manager until December 2022. He is expected to make his debut at the first match of the 2021 Campeonato Brasileiro Série A.

Transfers

Transfers in

Loans in

Transfers out

Loans out

Squad statistics

Overview

Campeonato Paulista

For the 2021 Campeonato Paulista, the 16 teams are divided in four groups of 4 teams (A, B, C, D). They faced all teams, except those that were in their own group, with the top two teams from each group qualifying for the quarterfinals. The two overall worst teams were relegated.

First stage

Knockout stages

Copa Sudamericana

Group stage

Campeonato Brasileiro

Results

Copa do Brasil

Preliminary stages

See also
List of Sport Club Corinthians Paulista seasons

Notes

References

Sport Club Corinthians Paulista seasons
Corinthians